Mount Louisa is a residential suburb in the City of Townsville, Queensland, Australia. The suburb contains the mountain Mount Louisa.

Geography 
The suburb Mount Louisa is located to the west of Townsville CBD. The residential areas of the suburb are on the low flat land to the north and south of the mountain. There is a small industrial area along the suburb's northern boundary.

History

The suburb takes its name from the mountain, which in turn was named by Andrew Ball in April 1864 while exploring Cleveland Bay.

During World War II as many as 4,000 American personnel worked and lived at Depot #2 at the base of Mount Louisa. This Air Depot has often been incorrectly referred to as the 4th Air Depot by many people. There were three main units based at Depot #2. They were the 4th Air Depot Group, the 12th Air Depot Group and the 15th Air Depot Group.  Entertainment in the camp was held at Helton Hall, which was an open aired building named after Master Sergeant Helton who was killed in the B-25 crash at Rattlesnake Island. Some famous Hollywood stars appeared at Helton Hall including John Wayne, Joe E. Brown, Gary Cooper, Una Merkel and Phyllis Brook. Woody Herman's orchestra also appeared at Helton Hall.

In 1986 the growth of the congregation at Garbutt Uniting Church necessitated a move a new church called House of Praise at 485 Bayswater Road in Mount Louisa. Due to disagreements over the Uniting Church's position on "sexuality", the congregation chose to leave the Uniting Church and now operate as an independent church called Mt Louisa Community Church.

Calvary Christian College opened on 1 February 1978.

Education 
Calvary Christian College is a private primary and secondary (Prep-12) school for boys and girls at 569 Bayswater Road. In 2017, the school had an enrolment of 797 students with 55 teachers (53 full-time equivalent) and 60 non-teaching staff (47 full-time equivalent).

There are no government schools in Mount Louisa. The nearest government primary schools are Heatley State School to the south-east in neighbouring Heatley, Kirwan State School and The Willows State School both to the south in neighbouring Kirwan, and Vincent State School in Vincent. The nearest government secondary schools are Heatley Secondary College in Heatley and Kirwan State High School in Kirwan.

References

Further reading

External links

 

Suburbs of Townsville
Queensland in World War II